The West Coast Senior Hockey League (WCSHL) is a senior ice hockey league with teams based in Newfoundland and Labrador.  The WCSHL was founded in 1996 as a senior B intermediate league and developed into a senior A league. It operated until the summer of 2011 when the WCSHL merged with the Avalon East Senior Hockey League to form the Newfoundland Senior Hockey League. 

The league resurfaced for the 2016–2017 season, with that season being shortened. For the 2017–2018 season it played an 18-game season, with teams based out of Corner Brook, Deer Lake, Stephenville, and Port aux Basques.

The league returned to action for the 2022-23 season with three competing teams from Corner Brook, Deer Lake, and Port aux Basques.

History

Teams

|2017-2018||Corner Brook Royals, Deer Lake Red Wings, Port-aux-Basques Mariners, Stephenville Jets|

League Champions
1996 
1997 
1998 
1999 
2000 
2001 Deer Lake Red Wings
2002 Corner Brook Royals
2003 Corner Brook Royals
2004 Corner Brook Royals
2005 Deer Lake Red Wings
2006 Deer Lake Red Wings
2007 Deer Lake Red Wings
2008 Deer Lake Red Wings
2009 Clarenville Caribous
2010 Clarenville Caribous
2011 Grand Falls-Windsor Cataracts

League Trophies and Awards

Top Goaltender Award (donated by Corner Brook West Sports Club)

Herder Champions
2001 Corner Brook Royals
2002 Deer Lake Red Wings
2005 Deer Lake Red Wings
2009 Clarenville Caribous
2010 Clarenville Caribous
2011 Grand Falls-Windsor Cataracts

Allan Cup Results
2011 Clarenville Caribous (2011 Allan Cup champions)

Defunct ice hockey leagues in Newfoundland and Labrador
Ice hockey in Newfoundland and Labrador